Martha Ngano was a Rhodesian independence activist of South African origin, active between the 1890s and the 1920s.

Background
Ngano was a Fingo, and was known for her abilities as a speaker and organizer. Well educated, she came to Rhodesia from South Africa in 1897 and soon became active in local affairs. She worked to expand suffrage for Africans, criticizing the lack of education in the English language at a time when literacy in the language was a prerequisite for being able to vote. She became active in the Rhodesian Bantu Voters' Association, expanding its reach into rural areas and addressing a variety of rural concerns in addition to those held by urban dwellers. Furthermore, she set up a legal defense fund for farmers and challenged the leadership of drunken and illiterate chiefs who she felt were not interested in the welfare of their subjects. Ultimately she became general secretary of the RBVA.

References

Year of birth unknown
Year of death unknown
Rhodesian people
Zimbabwean activists
Zimbabwean women activists
South African activists
South African women activists